Chartering may refer to:

 Air charter
 Chartering (shipping)

See also
Charter (disambiguation)